Johann (30 June 146816 August 1532), known as Johann the Steadfast or Johann the Constant (Johann, der Beständige), was Elector of Saxony from 1525 until 1532 from the House of Wettin.

He is notable for organising the Lutheran Church in the Electorate of Saxony from a state and administrative level. In that, he was aided by Martin Luther, whose "Saxon model" of a Lutheran church was also soon to be implemented beyond Saxony, in other territories of the Holy Roman Empire. Luther turned to the Elector for secular leadership and funds on behalf of a church largely shorn of its assets and income after the break with Rome.

He played a part in the Protestation at Speyer.

Biography

Born in Meissen, John was the fifth of the seven children of Ernest, Elector of Saxony and Elisabeth of Bavaria.
From 1486 onward he was the heir presumptive of his childless brother Frederick the Wise. John received a part of the paternal inheritance and afterwards assisted his kinsman, Maximilian I, Holy Roman Emperor, in several campaigns. On his brother's death in 1525 John inherited the title of Elector and as an early adherent of Luther was soon prominent among Protestant reformers. As his nickname "The Steadfast" indicates, he resolutely continued the policies of his brother toward protecting the progress of the Protestant Reformation.

Having assisted in suppressing an uprising during the German Peasants' War in 1525, John helped Philip I, Landgrave of Hesse, found the League of Gotha, formed in 1526 for the protection of the Reformers. He was active at the Diet of Speyer in 1526, and signed a protest against the recess of the diet. That gave him an opportunity to reform the church in Saxony, where a plan for divine service was drawn up by Luther. Thus in 1527 the Lutheran Church was established as the state church in Ernestine Saxony, with the Elector as Chief Bishop. John, who had already been a zealous Lutheran for some time, now exercised full authority over the Church, introduced the Lutheran Confession, ordered the deposition of all priests who continued in the Catholic faith, and directed the use of a vernacular liturgy drawn up by Luther. He was a leader of the Schmalkaldic League of Protestant states formed in 1530 to defend the Reformation, and assented to the Nuremberg religious peace in 1532.

As his nickname betrays, he had the same positive attitude to the Reformation as his older brother. His steadfastness and his courage to maintain his confessional position probably brought him the most fame with his contemporaries. Christian beliefs were the basis of his political decisions, which were regarded as very just. In political matters, he was often very hesitant. In his collaboration with Philip I, with whom he was closely connected by virtue of his common religious beliefs, Philip was the driving force for and outspoken advocate of a more for an aggressive foreign policy while John, on the other hand, was particularly concerned with the question of whether to defend himself as a Protestant against the Emperor.

As the patron of Martin Luther, John maintained a very close, almost friendly relationship with the leading theologian of the Protestants. Luther often expressed a positive opinion about John, especially for his behavior at the Diet of Augsburg in 1530, and praised him thus: "I am sure that the Elector Johann of Saxony had the Holy Spirit. In Augsburg he proved this admirably by his confession. John said, 'Tell my scholars that they are doing what is right, praise and honor God, and take no regard for me or my country.'" By his insistence on the Protestant profession of faith, John even went so far as to dismiss those Protestant theologians who were too compliant to the Emperor.
In 1529, John belonged to the princely representatives of the Protestant minority (protestation) at the Reichstag in Speyer.

In the almost 40 years that John governed as a duke over the Electorate of Saxony, he was often overshadowed by the person of his brother Frederick, who, as the eldest of the House of Wettin and the incumbent Elector, decisively determined the policy of Saxony. John is sometimes wrongly portrayed in the history and politics of the Electorate of Saxony as a background figure at the beginning of the Reformation, in contrast to his brother Frederick and his son and successor John Frederick.

The Evangelical Church in Germany honors John's significance during the Reformation, with a memorial day in the Evangelische Namenkalender on 16 August.

He died in Schweinitz. After his death he was, like his brother Frederick, buried in the famous Castle Church in Wittenberg with a grave by Hans Vischer. He was succeeded by his eldest son Johann Frederick.

Marriage and children
In Torgau on 1 March 1500 Johann married firstly Sophie of Mecklenburg-Schwerin, daughter of Magnus II, Duke of Mecklenburg. They had one son:

Johann Frederick I, Elector of Saxony (30 June 1503, Torgau3 March 1554, Weimar).

On 13 November 1513 Johann married secondly Margaret of Anhalt-Köthen in Torgau.  They had four children:

Maria (15 December 1515, Weimar7 January 1583, Wolgast), married on 27 February 1536 Duke Philip I of Pomerania-Wolgast
Margaret (25 April 1518, Zwickau10 March 1545), married Hans Buser
John (born and died 26 September 1519, Weimar)
John Ernest, Duke of Saxe-Coburg (10 May 1521, Coburg8 February 1553, Coburg).

Ancestry

References

External links

Longer biography

|-

Prince-electors of Saxony
House of Wettin
Burials at All Saints' Church, Wittenberg
People from Meissen
1468 births
1532 deaths
Saxon princes
Converts to Lutheranism from Roman Catholicism